Olufemi Onabajo is a Nigerian academic, a professor and a former Vice-Chancellor of Lead City University, a private university in Nigeria.

Career
Onabajo started his career as a secondary school teacher as at 1978. He worked as an editor in Ogun State Broadcasting Corporation (OGBC). He studied and was awarded a master's degree at the University of Lagos. He later joined the Nigerian Television Authority (NTA) in Ikeja, where he served for 10 years before becoming Controller of News and Current Affairs. He has written 23 books in the field of mass communication.

References

Living people
Year of birth missing (living people)
Academic staff of Lead City University
Vice-Chancellors of Nigerian universities
Nigerian mass media people
University of Lagos alumni
Place of birth missing (living people)